Shivasatakshi is a municipality in the southeastern part of Jhapa District in the Koshi Province of eastern Nepal. The new municipality was formed by merging four existing VDCs—Shivaganj, Satasidham, Dharampur, and Panchgachhi—on 2 Dec 2014. The office of the municipality is that of the former Satasidham village development committee (VDC).

Population
At the time of the 2011 Nepal Census, Shivaganj and Satasidham had population of 13,518 and 26,171 people living in 9,102 individual households. After the VDCs of Shivaganj, Satasidham, Panchgachhi and Dharampur were merged, it had a total population of 74,366 people .

Occupation
Agriculture is the main source of income of majority of people residing in Shivasatakshi.

Geography
Shivasatakshi municipality lies in the Terai region. It is bordered by Kankai municipality in the east, Kamal VDC in the west, Ilam district in the north, and Gauriganj in the south. 

There is plain land and evergreen forest. It lies in the middle part of Jhapa District. Due to its plain and fertile land it has high capability for agricultural production. Heavy rainfall occurs in this area during the summer season.

Healthcare
Healthcare in Shivasatakshi is not very well-developed. The absence of modern hospitals often necessitates the residents to travel to Damak, or Birtamod in case of a serious health issue.

Education 
Alike healthcare, the education services in Shivasatakshi are limited to undergrad level only. There are only handful of high-schools and very few colleges that teach upto Bachelors' level. As a result students have to go to either Damak or Birtamode for higher education.

Gallery

References

External links

Jhapa District

Populated places in Jhapa District
Municipalities in Koshi Province
Nepal municipalities established in 2014
Municipalities in Jhapa District